Sir David Lance Tompkins  (born 26 July 1929) is a New Zealand lawyer and jurist. He served as a judge of the High Court of New Zealand from 1983 and 1997, and also on the benches of the Courts of Appeal of Tonga and Fiji. He was chancellor of the University of Waikato between 1981 and 1985.

Early life and family
Tompkins was born in Hamilton on 26 July 1929, the son of Arthur Lance Tompkins and Marjorie Rees Tompkins (née Manning). His maternal grandfather was Arthur Edwards Manning, who served as mayor of Hamilton from 1912 to 1915, and his paternal great-aunt was the artist Helen Crabb. He was educated at Southwell School from 1939 to 1942, and King's College, Auckland from 1943 to 1946. He went on to study law at Auckland University College, graduating with a Bachelor of Laws degree in 1952.

In 1956, Tompkins married Erica Lya Felicity Faris, and the couple had three children, including Arthur Tompkins, who was appointed as a district court judge in 1997.

Career
Tompkins was a partner in the Hamilton legal firm of Tompkins Wake from 1953 to 1971, and continued practising as a barrister until 1983. He was appointed Queen's Counsel in 1974, and served as a judge of the Courts Martial Appeal Court between 1982 and 1983. In 1983, he was appointed to the bench of the High Court, serving as a judge until 1997, although he continued to serve after that as an acting judge. Between 1989 and 1992, he was executive judge of the High Court in Auckland, from 1995 he was a judge of the Court of Appeal of Tonga, and from 1997 a judge of the Court of Appeal of Fiji.

Tompkins was president of the Hamilton District Law Society between 1969 and 1971, and active in the New Zealand Law Society, serving as a council member from 1969 to 1971, and vice president from 1979 to 1981. He was also a LAWASIA council member between 1979 and 1981, and was chair of the Council of Legal Education from 1992 to 1998.

Outside of the legal sphere, Tompkins was president of Birthright Waikato in 1966, vice president and then president of the Outward Bound Trust from 1981 to 1984, and chancellor of the University of Waikato from 1981 to 1985.

Honours and awards
In 1977, Tompkins was awarded the Queen Elizabeth II Silver Jubilee Medal, and in 1990 he received the New Zealand 1990 Commemoration Medal. In the 1999 Queen's Birthday Honours, he was appointed a Knight Companion of the New Zealand Order of Merit, for services as a judge of the High Court and to the community.

In 1986, Tompkins was conferred with an honorary doctorate by the University of Waikato.

Later life
Tompkins' wife, Felicity, Lady Tompkins, died in 2019.

References

1929 births
Living people
People educated at King's College, Auckland
University of Auckland alumni
20th-century New Zealand judges
New Zealand King's Counsel
Chancellors of the University of Waikato
High Court of New Zealand judges
New Zealand judges on the courts of Fiji
New Zealand judges on the courts of Tonga
Knights Companion of the New Zealand Order of Merit